Birch House may refer to:

 Birch House (Falls Church, Virginia)
 Birch Island House, in Somerset County, Maine
 Annie Birch House, Hoytsville, Utah, listed on the National Register of Historic Places
 W. Taylor Birch House, Washington, D.C., designed by Thomas Franklin Schneider
 Caccia Birch House, in New Zealand

See also
Burch House (disambiguation)